Climatic change may refer to:
 Climatic Change (journal)
 Climate variability and change, climate change throughout Earth's history
 Climate change, climate change seen since the pre-industrial period